Jack Hacker (19 April 1914 – 17 September 1984) was an Australian rules footballer who played with South Melbourne in the Victorian Football League (VFL).

Career

South Melbourne
Hacker, a defender who could play in the ruck, was recruited by South Melbourne from Oaklands in New South Wales. He won South Melbourne's "most improved player" award in 1938 and went on to play 111 league games for the club. This included two finals in 1942, a semi final win over Footscray and preliminary final loss to Essendon. A knee injury kept him on the sidelines in 1945 and he also wasn't able to play senior football the following year.

His brother, Alf Hacker, played for fellow VFL club North Melbourne.

Coaching
Hacker was appointed playing coach of Hampden Football League club Camperdown in 1947 and led the team to the grand final, which they lost to Warrnambool.

He was captain-coach of Camperdown again in 1948, when they narrowly missed out on making another grand final, with a seven-point loss to South Warrnambool in the preliminary final.

In 1949 he coached Shepparton to a premiership in the Central Goulburn Valley Football League.

References

External links

1914 births
Australian rules footballers from New South Wales
Sydney Swans players
Camperdown Football Club players
Camperdown Football Club coaches
Shepparton Football Club players
People from the Riverina
1984 deaths